Celerity (Latin celeritas) may refer to:

 Speed, quickness
 Speed of light, celeritas
 Celerity BBS, a computer bulletin board system popular in the 1990s
 Celerity Computing Inc., defunct San Diego, California vendor
 Celerity IT, a Virginia-based web development consulting group
 The phase velocity, speed of propagation of a wave
 Proper velocity, an alternative way of measuring motion in relativity
 USS Celeritas (SP-665), a United States Navy patrol vessel
 Mirage Celerity, an American two-seat cabin monoplane 
 Celerity (carriage)

See also
 
 
 Celery 
 Celebrity 
 Celer (disambiguation)